Celonoptera is a monotypic moth genus in the family Geometridae. Its only species, Celonoptera mirificaria, is found in south-eastern Europe. Both the genus and species were first described by Julius Lederer in 1862.

References

Trichopterygini
Monotypic moth genera